The 1998 World Figure Skating Championships were held in Minneapolis, USA from March 29 through April 5. Medals were awarded in the disciplines of men's singles, ladies' singles, pair skating, and ice dancing.

Medal tables

Medalists

Medals by country

Competition notes
Due to the large number of participants, the men's and ladies' qualifying groups were split into groups A and B.

Results

Men

Referee:
 Walburga Grimm 

Assistant Referee:
 Charles Foster 

Judges:
 Gavril Velchev 
 Frank Parsons 
 Elfriede Beyer 
 Lucy J. Brennan 
 Seppo Kurtti 
 Prisca Binz-Moser 
 Ingelise Blangsted 
 Agnes Morvai 
 Odile Guedj 

Substitute judge:
 Fabio Bianchetti

Ladies

Referee:
 Ronald Pfenning 

Assistant Referee:
 Gerhardt Bubnik 

Judges:
 Julianna Beke 
 Alfred Korytek 
 Marianne Oeverby 
 Hideo Sugita 
 Rafaella Loccatelli 
 Christa Gunsam 
 Jacqueline Itschner 
 Susan Heffernan 
 Liliana Strechova 

Substitute judge:
 Wendy Langdon

Pairs

Referee:
 Sally-Anne Stapleford 

Assistant Referee:
 Marie Lundmark 

Judges:
 Maria Zuchowicz 
 Jiasheng Yang 
 Hugh Graham 
 Igor Prokop 
 Gьnther Teichmann 
 Robert Worsfold 
 Ubavka Novakovic-Kytinoy 
 Susan Lynch 
 Alain Miguel 

Substitute judge:
 Vladislav Petukhov

Ice dancing

Referee:
 Ann Shaw 

Assistant Referee:
 Ludmila Mikhailovskaya 

Judges:
 Katalin Alpern 
 Elena Buriak 
 Monika Zeidler 
 Yury Balkov 
 Isabella Micheli 
 Armelle Van Eybergen 
 Patricia S. French 
 Irina Absaliamova 
 Janet Coton 

Substitute judge:
 Evgenia Karnolska

External links
 1998 Worlds results

World Figure Skating Championships
World Figure Skating Championships
World Figure Skating Championships
International figure skating competitions hosted by the United States
Sports competitions in Minneapolis
March 1998 sports events in the United States
April 1998 sports events in the United States
1998 in sports in Minnesota
1990s in Minneapolis